George Boggs Jr. (1899 – death unknown) was an American Negro league pitcher . 

A native of Virginia, Boggs made his Negro leagues debut in 1921 with the Cleveland Tate Stars. He went on to play for several teams, finishing his career in 1928 with the  Cleveland Tigers and Baltimore Black Sox.

References

External links
 and Baseball-Reference Black Baseball stats and Seamheads 

1899 births
Date of birth missing
Place of birth missing
Place of death missing
Year of death missing
Baltimore Black Sox players
Cleveland Tate Stars players
Cleveland Tigers (baseball) players
Dayton Marcos players
Detroit Stars players
Milwaukee Bears players
Baseball pitchers